Quai d'Orsay is a premium cigar brand, made in Cuba under contract with Habanos SA.

History 

The Quai d'Orsay brand was created by Cubatabaco in 1973 for the French state tobacco monopoly, SEITA, and was blended with French tastes in mind, being a milder brand.  There are a few competing stories as to what the marque's name refers to: one is that it is referring simply to the famous Paris avenue, another is that it refers to the French Foreign Ministry that is located on it, and another is that it is referring to the headquarters of SEITA which is also on the same avenue.

Quai d'Orsay was apparently outside of the umbrella of Habanos SA for a number of years and was managed directly by Cubatabaco and SEITA, but judging by packaging, Habanos SA documents, and SEITA's merger with Tabacalera into the multi-national tobacco company of Altadis, it appears Quai d'Orsay is a part of Habanos SA like all other Cuban-made brands of cigars.

Another oddity of the Quai d'Orsay line are its Corona cigars.  Up until the late 1980s, Quai d'Orsay still manufactured its Coronas in two different wrapper shades: Claro and Claro Claro.  As the fashion for lighter wrappers diminished (and supposedly as consumers noticed they were paying more for essentially the same cigar with the wrapper making a very minor difference) production eventually ceased of the Coronas Claro Claro.  Though the box still says Coronas on it, the official production name is still Coronas Claro.

Vitolas in the Quai d'Orsay Line

The following list of vitolas de salida (commercial vitolas) within the Quai d'Orsay marque lists their size and ring gauge in Imperial (and Metric), their vitolas de galera (factory vitolas), and their common name in American cigar slang.

Hand-Made Vitolas
 Corona Claro - 5 5/8" x 42 (143 x 16.67 mm), Corona, a corona
 Imperial - 7" x 47 (178 x 18.65 mm), Julieta No. 2, a churchill
 Panetela - 7" x 33 (178 x 13.10 mm), Ninfa, a slim panetela
 Hermosos No.2  - 6 1/8" x 48 (157 x 19.05 mm) Senadores [2019 Limited Edition]

See also 
 Cigar brands

References
 Nee, Min Ron. An Illustrated Encyclopaedia of Post-Revolution Havana Cigars (2003, Reprinted: 2005),

External links
 Official website of Habanos S.A.
 Reviews of Quai d'Orsay Cigars

Habanos S.A. brands